Christian Ménard (born 7 April 1946 in Quimper, Finistère) is a member of the National Assembly of France.  He represents the Finistère department,  and is a member of the Union for a Popular Movement.

References

1946 births
Living people
Politicians from Quimper
Union for a Popular Movement politicians
Deputies of the 12th National Assembly of the French Fifth Republic
Deputies of the 13th National Assembly of the French Fifth Republic
University of Nantes alumni
20th-century French physicians